Mr. T is the forty-third studio album by American country music singer Conway Twitty. The album was released in 1981, by MCA Records.

Track listing

Charts

References

1981 albums
Conway Twitty albums
MCA Records albums
Albums produced by Ron Chancey